The name Isis was used for five tropical cyclones in the Eastern Pacific Ocean.
 Hurricane Isis (1980)
 Tropical Storm Isis (1986)
 Tropical Storm Isis (1992)
 Hurricane Isis (1998) – Killed 14 in Mexico
 Hurricane Isis (2004)

The name Isis was removed from the naming list in 2015, due to the name's association with the Islamic State of Iraq and the Levant (often called ISIS), and replaced by Ivette for the 2016 Pacific hurricane season.

Isis was also used to name one tropical cyclone in the South-West Indian Ocean.
 Severe Tropical Storm Isis (1973)

Pacific hurricane set index articles